Alute was a clan of Manchu nobility. The clan initially belonged to Mongol Plain Blue Banner, but later was transferred to Manchu Bordered Yellow Banner, one of the upper banners of Eight Banner System. Some descendants of the clan adopted surname Ke (克).

Notable figures

Males
Dexing (德兴)
Jinghui (景辉), a top candidate on provincial examination (翻译举人, pinyin:fangyu juren)
Saišangga (賽尚阿/赛尚阿; 1794–1875), served as the Minister of Works from 1841 to 1845
Chongqi (崇綺/崇绮; 1829–1900), the top candidate in the 1865 imperial examination, served as a fourth rank literary official (侍講) in the Hanlin Academy, the Minister of Revenue from 1884 to 1886 and in 1900 and the Minister of Personnel in 1886, and held the title of a third class duke (三等公)
Chonggang (崇纲), a fifth rank literary official (员外郎)
Kechang (克昌)
 Prince Consort

Females
Imperial Consort
 Empress
 Empress Xiaozheyi (1854–1875), the Tongzhi Emperor's empress

 Imperial Noble Consort
 Imperial Noble Consort Gongsu (1857–1921), the Tongzhi Emperor's consort

Family tree

Gallery

References 

Manchu clans
Plain Blue Banner
Bordered Yellow Banner